Monongahela Cemetery is a historic rural cemetery in Monongahela City, Pennsylvania, established in 1863. Landscape architects Hare & Hare designed a portion of the property.

The cemetery was listed on the U.S. National Register of Historic Places in 2001.

The cemetery now occupies 160 acres, but only about 100 acres are included in the National Register listing.  John Chislett designed the original 32-acre plot in the rural cemetery tradition. About 60 acres were added in 1915 and designed in the lawn park style by Hare & Hare.  The five-acre St. Mary's Cemetery was opened c. 1900 and incorporated into the 1915 expansion.

Notable interments

Robert Grant Furlong (1886–1973), US Congressman
Baptiste "Bap" Manzini (1920–2008), professional football player
Armand Niccolai (1911–1988), professional football player

The cemetery contains two Commonwealth war graves of World War II, a flight engineer of Royal Air Force Ferry Command and a sapper of the Royal Canadian Engineers.

References

External links

 Monongahela Cemetery at Find A Grave

Cemeteries on the National Register of Historic Places in Pennsylvania
Gothic Revival architecture in Pennsylvania
1863 establishments in Pennsylvania
Cemeteries in Pennsylvania
Buildings and structures in Washington County, Pennsylvania
Monongahela, Pennsylvania
National Register of Historic Places in Washington County, Pennsylvania
Rural cemeteries